ACCT  may refer to:
Academy of Canadian Cinema & Television
African College of Commerce and Technology, a private tertiary educational institution in Uganda
 Agence de Coopération Culturelle et Technique, the precursor to what is now the Organisation internationale de la Francophonie
 Association for Challenge Course Technology, an organization that publishes voluntary standards for adventure activities such as zip-lining in the U.S.
 Association of Community College Trustees, a non-profit educational organization
 Acct (protocol), a computer network protocol

See also
 Account (disambiguation) or accounting